Linus Clifford Diaz (born 23 September 1933) is a Sri Lankan former long-distance runner. He competed in the marathon at the 1960 Summer Olympics.

References

External links
 

1933 births
Living people
Athletes (track and field) at the 1960 Summer Olympics
Sri Lankan male long-distance runners
Sri Lankan male marathon runners
Olympic athletes of Sri Lanka
Sportspeople from Kandy
20th-century Sri Lankan people
21st-century Sri Lankan people